HLA-B75 (B75) is an HLA-B serotype. The serotype identifies certain B*15 gene-allele protein products of HLA-B.

B75 is one of many split antigens of the broad antigen, B15.  B75 (B*1502) is associated with a severe drug-induced skin condition in ethnic East Asians.

Serotype

Alleles

Diseases
HLA-B*1502 is associated with Carbamazepine and phenytoin induced Stevens–Johnson syndrome in Chinese and Thai. One study showed a 100% association between B*1502 and the drug induced skin disorder in Chinese. In Europe the B*1502 positive patients are only found in this syndrome of persons of East Asian descent, however B58 confers susceptibility to both groups but to a lesser degree and is sensitive to allopurinol.

References

7
Drug-sensitivity genes